Alexander Rando (born April 15, 2001) is an American soccer player who plays for New York City FC II in the MLS Next Pro.

Playing career

Youth
Rando played as part of the New York City FC academy until 2019, where he was a two-time U-19 U.S Development Academy National Champion.

College
In 2019, Rando attended Stanford University to play college soccer, but never appeared for team after returning home before the start of the season.  For 2020, Rando transferred to the University of Virginia, where he made 10 appearances during a season affected by the COVID-19 pandemic. Prior to joining Virginia, Rando spent two-and-a-half weeks with League of Ireland side Dundalk.

Professional
On May 22, 2021, it was announced Rando was on the roster for USL Championship club Las Vegas Lights and he immediately made his debut against Phoenix Rising, starting in a 5–1 loss.

On March 24, 2022, it was announced Rando had signed with MLS Next Pro side New York City FC II ahead of the league's inaugural season.

Personal
Rando has dual citizenship, holding an Irish passport through his mother.

References 

2001 births
American soccer players
American people of Irish descent
Association football goalkeepers
Las Vegas Lights FC players
Living people
Soccer players from New York (state)
Stanford Cardinal men's soccer players
USL Championship players
Virginia Cavaliers men's soccer players
New York City FC II players
MLS Next Pro players